Ahad Hosseini (Azerbaijani: Əhəd Hüseyni/احد حوسئيني; Persian احد حسيني; born 14 August 1944 in Tabriz) is an Iranian Azerbaijani sculptor and painter.

He was born in 1944 in Tabriz, East Azerbaijan Province, northwest Iran. During his 2-year military service, he worked as teacher-soldier in a small mountain village located on the Caspian coast. A sense of loneliness in this remote village drove him to find his talent in sculpture. His first works of sculpture were of Einstein, Bertrand Russell, Beethoven, and Dr. Albert Schweitzer. He then worked for a short period in Parviz Tanavoli's atelier in Tehran.

In 1972, he studied art in Italy as a student at the Accademia di Belle Arti (Academy of Fine Arts) of Florence. After returning to Tabriz, he concentrated upon his work and created his 12 sculptures called "Misery Around the World" which he presented them to the Azerbaijan Museum. The works are made of bronze and consists of different depictions of human misery.

Between 1980 and 1982, Hosseini taught sculpture in Tabriz and edited a book entitled "What is Art?". He then lived in Turkey and made some sculptures for Istanbul University. His work "Thinking Man" is in the Istanbul University Faculty of Political Sciences.

From 1984 until 1990, Hosseini studied and worked at the (École nationale supérieure des arts décoratifs) (School of Decorative Arts) in Paris. There he explored "form". In 1993 he made about 60 masks for a French TV show.

Hoseini's works have been displayed at many French art fairs:
1986 in Unesco,
1987 in Morangis,
1988 in Ris Orangis
1994 in Doaine ä Arcueil
1995 in Cachan Theatre,
1996 in the Hongrios Institute and Bernanos Gallery,

Works
 Misery Around the World including a collection of 12 episodes: Ignorance, War, Chains of Misery, The Miserable, Hunger, Political Prisoner, A Crystal Ball, Population growth, Racial Discrimination, 5 Monsters of Death, Anxiety and Autumn of Life (Azerbaijan Museum).
 Mona Lisa's Statue (School of Decorative Arts of Paris)

References

 https://web.archive.org/web/20110711022222/http://www2.france-galop.com/fgweb/Domaines/Courses/course_detail.aspx?aaCrse=1994&spCrse=P&numCrsePgm=00944

External links
 http://www.artpulsion.com/artist.asp?artistID=87
 :File:Shahriyar - Tabrizu.jpg
 https://www.youtube.com/watch?v=sEECM_GwAwg
 https://web.archive.org/web/20110715072522/http://www.perche-web.com/wordpress/?tag=ahad-hosseini
 http://www.ouest-france.fr/2008/07/04/remalard/Durant-quatre-annees-Ahad-Hosseini-a-sculpte-sa-Joconde--54023906.html

1944 births
Iranian painters
Living people
People from Tabriz
Iranian sculptors